Weddikkara Ruwan Sujeewa de Silva (born 7 October 1979) is a former Sri Lankan cricketer. He is a right-handed batsman and a left-arm medium-fast bowler. He is a past student of Kalutara Vidyalaya.

Domestic career
In 2000 he broke the record for the most wickets in the Premier Under-23 Trophy, but failed to attract the selectors. He made his Twenty20 debut on 17 August 2004, for Colombo Cricket Club in the 2004 SLC Twenty20 Tournament.

International career
He made his Test debut on 21 July 2002 against Bangladesh as the 89th Test cap. In 2007, he was called up to the squad as cover for injured Chanaka Welagedara, but did not play a match.

References

1979 births
Living people
Sri Lankan cricketers
Sri Lanka Test cricketers
Galle Cricket Club cricketers
Sebastianites Cricket and Athletic Club cricketers
Ruhuna cricketers